Broad Creek may refer to the following locations:

Rivers
Broad Creek (Nanticoke River tributary), a stream in Sussex County, Delaware
Broad Creek (Bogue Sound),  North Carolina, US
Broad Creek (South Australia), flows into Barker Inlet, South Australia
Broad Creek (Susquehanna River), Maryland, US

Other places
 Broad Creek Hundred, Delaware, US
 Broad Creek, Maryland, a former town on Kent Island, Md, US
 Broad Creek Memorial Scout Reservation, US
 Broad Creek, North Carolina, US
 Broad Creek, Prince George's County, Maryland, US
Broad Creek Soapstone Quarries, Maryland, US

See also
Broad River (disambiguation)